The holidays in The Bahamas include the following:

In the Bahamas, holidays that fall on a Saturday or Sunday are typically celebrated on the following Monday. Events that fall on a Tuesday typically are celebrated on the previous Monday. Holidays that fall on Wednesdays or Thursdays (with the exception of Independence Day, Christmas Day, and Boxing Day) are celebrated the following Friday.

Public holidays

Variable dates

2021
Easter – April 4
Whit Monday – May 24 
Labour Day – June 4
August Monday – August 2
National Heroes' Day – October 11
2022
Easter – April 17
Labour Day – June 3
Whit Monday – June 6 
August Monday – August 1
National Heroes' Day – October 10
2023
Easter – April 9
Whit Monday – May 29 
Labour Day – June 2
August Monday – August 7
National Heroes' Day – October 9
2024
Easter – March 31
Whit Monday – May 20 
Labour Day – June 7
August Monday – August 5
National Heroes' Day – October 14
2025
Easter – April 20
Labour Day – June 6
Whit Monday – June 9
August Monday – August 4
National Heroes' Day – October 13
2026
Easter – April 5
Labour Day – June 5
Whit Monday – 
August Monday – August 3
National Heroes' Day – October 12
2027
Easter – March 28 
Labour Day – June 4
Whit Monday – 
August Monday – August 2
National Heroes' Day – October 11
2028
Easter – April 16
Labour Day – June 2
Whit Monday – 
August Monday – August 7
National Heroes' Day – October 9
2029
Easter – April 1
Labour Day – June 1
Whit Monday – 
August Monday – August 6
National Heroes' Day – October 8

References 

 
Bahamian culture
Bahamas